Mershon may refer to :

Mershon, Georgia
Kathy Mershon (born Kate Louise Martin) is a fictional character on the soap opera All My Children. 
The Mershon Center is an academic think tank at the Ohio State University in the United States. 
Ralph D. Mershon was an engineer, inventor, and benefactor of Ohio State University.